Peñarroya de Tastavins or Pena-roja is a municipality located in the Matarranya comarca, province of Teruel, Aragon, Spain. According to the 2004 census (INE), the municipality has a population of 527 inhabitants. It is part of the Taula del Sénia free association of municipalities.

Pena-roja has a special relationship with the town of Vallibona over the hills in the Ports (comarca). It has been recorded that festivities have been celebrated together with that town at least since the 14th century.

See also
Ports de Tortosa-Beseit
Vallibona

Bibliography
Teofil Pitarch i Vives, Fraternitas Saecularis: Vallibona/Pena-roja de Tastavins, Diputació de Castelló. 2005,

References

External links 
 
 Web page for this town

Municipalities in the Province of Teruel
Matarraña/Matarranya